Rebecca "Rikki" Barnes is a fictional character appearing in American comic books published by Marvel Comics. Created by writer Jeph Loeb and artist Rob Liefeld, the character first appeared in Heroes Reborn #1/2 (September 1996), where she was established as the Counter-Earth granddaughter of Bucky during the 1996 "Heroes Reborn" storyline. Rikki crossed over to Earth-616 in the 2008 Onslaught Reborn miniseries, in which she operated as Nomad for a time, later joining the Exiles in another reality after being repeatedly reincarnated in her grandfather's place, and then the Future Foundation in the mainstream Marvel Universe.

Fictional character biography

Heroes Reborn
Rikki Barnes was first introduced in the Heroes Reborn series of books. She is native to this world that was created by Franklin Richards in order to save his family, the Fantastic Four, and the rest of the heroes who 'died' fighting Onslaught. Franklin was able to access this world through a blue orb he created. The heroes were healed and given new memories to adjust to this new reality. Rikki Barnes was a native to this world and granddaughter to her world's version of Bucky Barnes.

Her brother John was involved with a radical group led by the Red Skull and through that contact she met Captain America, eventually becoming his protégé. He and the other heroes left this world when they realized the danger they presented to it in Heroes Return, and Rikki stayed behind. Through various events this world was eventually brought into the Marvel Universe proper and is now the new Counter-Earth. But the crossover caused great ecological change and half the world was submerged underwater. Rikki eventually formed a group of like minded individuals to bring order, and they called themselves the Young Allies.

Onslaught Reborn
After the events of M-Day, Franklin became the target of an Onslaught that had been reborn from the mutant energy that had been stolen and unleashed during the events of that series. In an effort to escape the villain, Franklin revealed a green orb that contained a copy of the Heroes Reborn universe; however in this world the Heroes did not leave so all the damage that happened when the world was moved from its pocket dimension did not happen. Franklin, while running from Onslaught, eventually encountered Rikki, who summoned the Avengers to battle entity.

The fight against Onslaught would lead to the Baxter Building where Rikki sacrificed herself to push Onslaught into the Negative Zone. Rikki died willingly, but instead of dying, she found herself in the main reality Earth 616.

Nomad
Hearing that her Captain America was dead, Rikki felt lost again and clung to the only things she had, her heroism and her brother. While not technically her brother, she sought out John Barnes of Earth-616 and falsified an ID so she could go stay close to him. This John Barnes was actually a pretty nice guy, so she pretended to be Rikki Baines, his schoolmate and best friend. Rikki heard that there was a new Captain America and she desperately tried to meet him, not knowing that he was James Buchanan Barnes, the Earth 616 counterpart to her own grandfather. However, before she could meet him, she was intercepted by Black Widow, who knew exactly who Rikki was, and cautioned her about trying to meet Captain America.

While in school, she noticed several classmates acting oddly and believed something was up, but John felt she was just being paranoid. Rikki tried to investigate the school at night, following the students, but instead she found a wolfman who injured her and ripped her suit. When she got back to her modest apartment (which she paid for by washing dishes in a restaurant), she found a brand new Nomad costume and a note that it was for her. The next day at a coffee shop with John, she found the courage to ask John about his family. It turned out that his mother died during childbirth giving birth to his little sister, who also died, and his father died in a terrorist attack on Philadelphia. It was difficult for Rikki to hear about how she was never born, but just then a bomb went off across the street. Flag-Smasher was attacking a military recruitment facility. John was injured in the explosion, but Rikki put on her Nomad costume to fight Flag-Smasher. She was aided by Falcon who she remembered, but like the others who left the Heroes Reborn universe he had no memory of her. Rikki explained who she was and where she was from and Falcon suggested she continue being Nomad, whoever gave her the costume thought she could handle it. When John was released from the hospital Rikki visited him but he mistook her friendship for attraction and Rikki had to rebuff his advances and tell him she thought of him as a brother.

John was hurt and refused to speak to her and ended up turning to the people who were brainwashing the students at their school. Nomad investigated Desmond Daniels whom the brainwashed students were supporting, believing he was behind it. Rikki was then attacked and taken prisoner by the wolfman and the mastermind behind it all. John finally became concerned when Rikki missed a few days of school while she was being brainwashed like the others, though it proved more difficult to affect her. She was released and was made to reveal her identity to the whole school and publicly support the student council nominee, Desmond Daniels. The brainwashing scheme turned out to all be a plot by the Secret Empire as an experiment to test if they could influence voting patterns by brainwashing specific members of different groups, causing the majority to follow their lead.

The Secret Empire wanted to shut down the experiment, but Professor Power, the mastermind behind the experiment who was pretending to be a politics teacher at the school, refused to shut the experiment down, thus allowing the entire school to riot. He intended to kill Rikki, but she managed to escape and fight off the super-villain and his wolfman henchman. The Young Avengers arrived to assist Rikki and the police with crowd control to defuse the situation. John realized the students were brainwashed to follow Desmond Daniels, who was himself an innocent pawn, and it was actually another student, Matt Surman, who was inciting the riot. Rikki got Desmond to calm the rioters, while John confronted Matt. Matt shot John and Rikki; Rikki's uniform protected her, but John was not so lucky and his wounds proved to be fatal. Rikki later visited John's grave back in their home town of Philadelphia. She didn't blame Matt for the murder, since it was a result of the brainwashing from the Secret Empire. It was then that Captain America arrived and spoke to her for the first time. He said Barnes was a great name and that she shouldn't let this affect her duty because she'd make Steve Rogers proud. She asked if it was him that gave her the Nomad costume which he replies that he had not, and assumed that she had made it herself. Meanwhile, Black Widow, who had been watching the two interact, smiled, suggesting it had been her that had given the costume to Rikki.

Rikki began a new life as Nomad in the limited series Nomad: Girl Without A World, by Sean McKeever and David Baldeon. This led to a Nomad back-up story from the same creative team behind the "Two Americas" storyline.

This story introduced the character to Anya Corazon, which paved the way for McKeever and Baldeon to use these characters as the core of a new team and series Young Allies.

During the team's first mission, Rikki and Araña are captured by a team of teenaged supervillains who call themselves the Bastards of Evil (as they are all supposedly illegitimate children of famous super-villains, although some are in fact too old to have been born after their alleged parents gained superhuman abilities and are thus either misinformed or pretending about their parentage). In order to establish themselves as a viable threat, the Bastards link up a video feed of the bound and gagged Rikki and Araña across New York City, with the intent of executing the heroines in front of a massive audience. While Araña distracts the villains, Rikki breaks the bonds from her wrists and enables the girls' escape. When the rest of the Allies arrive, they promptly defeat the Bastards, with Rikki taking down Pyro's son Ember. Just as the Allies are about to celebrate their victory, Rikki is attacked and thrown through a wall by a newly arrived villain named the Superior. After a fierce confrontation, Rikki and her teammates defeat the Bastards, and turn them over to the Avengers.

Onslaught Unleashed
Rikki recently began having strange and vivid nightmares from deep in the jungles of South America, the problem appears to be that they may not be dreams at all when her teammate Toro is kidnapped just like she dreamed. Later while investigating Corporate Conglomerate Roxxon for illegal weapons systems, the Secret Avengers come across the plans for Project Power, a new and incredibly deadly power source being secretly developed in the Colombian rainforest. As the Secret Avengers investigate the facility, Beast and Ant-Man find the source of the mysterious energy source to be from the Negative Zone. As Rikki races inside the facility to locate Toro, she stumbles into the control room instead, where the sinister voice of her dreams beckons, clawing his way out of exile in the Negative Zone, the psychic beast known as Onslaught returns to the main universe.
 
Possessing Rikki's body, Onslaught reveals that the real Rikki had in fact died in the Negative Zone and she was just a construct made by Onslaught himself so he could use the energy he had stored in her as an anchor to pull himself back into Earth-616. The revelation that Rikki had been sent to Earth-616 solely to serve as Onslaught's tether forced Rikki to fight back, if only to prove he was wrong. Eventually, Rikki had Gravity kill her so that Onslaught could not return and destroy Earth. However, Steve later has a similar dream to Rikki's, suggesting that something of her still remains.

Reincarnated in the Multiverse
After her death — and owing to Reed Richards and Molecule Man reordering the Multiverse — a surprised Rikki found herself reborn into other realities; mostly as the partner of alternative versions of Captain America. In one of them, where Steve Rogers was killed before he could become Captain America, as Becky Barnes, she became Peggy Carter's partner after the latter took Roger's place in the Super Soldier Program. However, an atomic bomb triggered by the Red Skull in New Jersey killed them both, only for them to find themselves back alive in yet another reality, where they joined the Exiles fighting the Tribunal, a band of rogue Watchers. During this time, Rikki establishes a relationship with Valkyrie.

Rikki later dies under unrecorded circumstances, to be reincarnated into yet another reality where she is in a relationship with Toni Ho until they are killed by The Maker one week after her mental reawakening.

Future Foundation
Rikki is next seen in space as a prisoner on the planet L'ar Gath Five in the main Marvel Universe. She is sprung from captivity by the Future Foundation while they are seeking to reassemble the scattered remains of Molecule Man, one part of which Rikki had accidentally contacted. There she confronts the Maker once more, and upon meeting Foundation member Julie Power, the two develop a romantic attraction to each other.

Other versions

What if?: Age of Ultron
A middle-age version of Rikki appears in the future world of issue 3. As this came out after Onslaught Unleashed, this suggests that the character may return to life in the main Marvel Universe, which is later realized in the Future Foundation series (see above).

Exiles Vol. 3
In Exiles Vol. 3, after romancing Rikki's "Becky Barnes" reincarnation, Valkyrie encounters an alternate version of Becky who serves as a member of the pirate crew of Benjamin "Blackbeard" Grimm, both flirting with one another before Valkyrie is reunited with Rikki. While later trapped in a vision by rogue Watchers, Rikki sees a reality where she is unhappily married to a man.

Powers and abilities
Rikki is a natural athlete who was trained by S.H.I.E.L.D. and Captain America. She is a gifted fighter, marksman and acrobat with the familiarity with technological devices of a S.H.I.E.L.D. agent.

Due to the special circumstances of her creation, which was influenced by Franklin Richard's idolization of both Captain America and his own mother, Rikki is repeatedly reincarnated into another reality after death, with her full memory of her past lives as well as selected injuries and scars and her trademark equipment.

Weapons and equipment
As Bucky she wore a bulletproof costume modeled after the original Bucky. She also made use of a vibranium-photonic energy shield along with vibranium soled boots that allowed her to run up walls, move silently, leap greater distances and land from great heights. She also wielded a pistol.

As Nomad, she made use of much of the same equipment with a new costume based on the Nomad identity once worn by Steve Rogers. She retains the vibranium-photonic shield and now uses throwing discs used by previous Nomads. It is possible she still possesses the vibranium soled boots, though she no longer used the pistol in that new identity. With her subsequent rebirth, she has returned to using her old gear.

Collected editions

References

External links
 

Comics characters introduced in 1996
Characters created by Rob Liefeld
Characters created by Jeph Loeb
United States-themed superheroes
Marvel Comics martial artists
Marvel Comics female superheroes
Marvel Comics LGBT superheroes
Fictional bisexual females
Fictional shield fighters